Title 13 of the United States Code outlines the role of the United States Census in the United States Code.

Chapters 
 : Administration
 : Collection and Publication of Statistics
 : Censuses
 : Offenses and Penalties
 : Collection and Publication of Foreign Commerce and Trade Statistics
 : Exchange of Census Information

References

External links
U.S. Code Title 13, via United States Government Printing Office
U.S. Code Title 13, via Cornell University

13